Daniel R. Barrone is an American politician who served as the mayor of Taos, New Mexico, from 2018 to 2022. Barrone was also a member of the New Mexico House of Representatives from 2020 to 2021.

Early life and education 
Barrone earned a Bachelor of Arts degree in business from the New Mexico State University.

Career 
Barrone has worked for over 26 years at Olguin's Sawmill, a full-service mill located in El Prado, New Mexico. In 2006, he was elected to serve as a member of the Taos County Commission. In March 2018, Barrone was elected to serve as the mayor of Taos. In 2020, after incumbent representative Roberto Gonzales was nominated to serve in the New Mexico Senate, the Taos County Commission voted to appoint Barrone to his vacant seat in the House. He took office on January 4, 2020. On April 17, 2020, Barrone announced that he would not seek a full term in the House in the 2020 election, citing his concern about the COVID-19 pandemic and its effect on Taos.

References 

Democratic Party members of the New Mexico House of Representatives
Mayors of places in New Mexico
New Mexico State University alumni
Year of birth missing (living people)
Living people